Areh Jan (also Romanized as Āreh Jān, Arreh Jān, and Areh Jān; also known as Arjān, Eradzyan, and Zaradzian) is a village in Ozomdel-e Jonubi Rural District, in the Central District of Varzaqan County, East Azerbaijan Province, Iran. At the 2006 census, its population was 449, in 84 families.

References 

Towns and villages in Varzaqan County